Mountain is a 2015 Israeli drama film directed by Yaelle Kayam. It was screened in the Discovery section of the 2015 Toronto International Film Festival.

Cast
 Shani Klein as Zvia
 Avshalom Pollak as Reuven

References

External links
 

2015 films
2015 drama films
Israeli drama films
2010s Hebrew-language films
2015 directorial debut films